Mars is the fourth planet from the Sun and the second-smallest planet in the Solar System, larger only than Mercury. In the English language, Mars is named for the Roman god of war. Mars is a terrestrial planet with a thin atmosphere and has a crust primarily composed of elements similar to Earth's crust, as well as a core made of iron and nickel. Mars has surface features such as impact craters, valleys, dunes, and polar ice caps. Mars has two small, irregularly shaped moons, Phobos and Deimos.

Some of the most notable surface features on Mars include Olympus Mons, the largest volcano and highest-known mountain in the Solar System, and Valles Marineris, one of the largest canyons in the Solar System. The Borealis basin in the Northern Hemisphere covers approximately 40% of the planet and may be a large impact feature. Days and seasons on Mars are comparable to those of Earth, as the planets have a similar rotation period and tilt of the rotational axis relative to the ecliptic plane. Liquid water on the surface of Mars cannot exist due to low atmospheric pressure, which is less than 1% of the atmospheric pressure on Earth. Both of Mars's polar ice caps appear to be made largely of water. In the distant past, Mars was likely wetter, and thus possibly more suited for life. It is not known whether life has ever existed on Mars.

Mars has been explored by several uncrewed spacecraft, beginning with Mariner 4 in 1965. NASA's Viking 1 lander transmitted the first images from the Martian surface in 1976. Two countries have successfully deployed rovers on Mars, the United States first doing so with Sojourner in 1997 and China with Zhurong in 2021. There are also planned future missions to Mars, such as a NASA-ESA Mars Sample Return set to happen in 2026, and the Rosalind Franklin rover mission, which was intended to launch in 2018 but was delayed to 2024 at the earliest, with a more likely launch date at 2028.

Mars can be viewed from Earth with the naked eye, as can its reddish coloring. This appearance, due to the iron oxide prevalent on its surface, has led to Mars often being called the Red Planet. It is among the brightest objects in Earth's sky, with an apparent magnitude that reaches −2.94, comparable to that of Jupiter and surpassed only by Venus, the Moon and the Sun. Mars has been observed since ancient times. Over the millennia it has been featured in culture and the arts in ways that have reflected humanity's growing knowledge of it.

Historical observations 

The history of observations of Mars is marked by the oppositions of Mars when the planet is closest to Earth and hence is most easily visible, which occur every couple of years. Even more notable are the perihelic oppositions of Mars, which are distinguished because Mars is close to perihelion, making it even closer to Earth.

Ancient and medieval observations 

The ancient Sumerians named Mars Nergal, the god of war and plague. During Sumerian times, Nergal was a minor deity of little significance, but, during later times, his main cult center was the city of Nineveh. In Mesopotamian texts, Mars is referred to as the "star of judgement of the fate of the dead." The existence of Mars as a wandering object in the night sky was also recorded by the ancient Egyptian astronomers and, by 1534 BCE, they were familiar with the retrograde motion of the planet. By the period of the Neo-Babylonian Empire, the Babylonian astronomers were making regular records of the positions of the planets and systematic observations of their behavior. For Mars, they knew that the planet made 37 synodic periods, or 42 circuits of the zodiac, every 79 years. They invented arithmetic methods for making minor corrections to the predicted positions of the planets. Commonly, the Greek name for the planet now referred to as Mars, was Ares. It was the Romans who named the planet Mars, for their god of war, often represented by the sword and shield of the planet's namesake.

In the fourth century BCE, Aristotle noted that Mars disappeared behind the Moon during an occultation, indicating that the planet was farther away. Ptolemy, a Greek living in Alexandria, attempted to address the problem of the orbital motion of Mars. Ptolemy's model and his collective work on astronomy was presented in the multi-volume collection later called the Almagest (from the Arabic for "greatest"), which became the authoritative treatise on Western astronomy for the next fourteen centuries. Literature from ancient China confirms that Mars was known by Chinese astronomers by no later than the fourth century BCE. In the East Asian cultures, Mars is traditionally referred to as the "fire star", based on the Wuxing system.

During the seventeenth century A.D., Tycho Brahe measured the diurnal parallax of Mars that Johannes Kepler used to make a preliminary calculation of the relative distance to the planet. From Brahe's observations of Mars, Kepler deduced that the planet orbited the Sun not in a circle, but in an ellipse. Moreover, Kepler showed that Mars sped up as it approached the Sun and slowed down as it moved farther away, in a manner that later physicists would explain as a consequence of the conservation of angular momentum. When the telescope became available, the diurnal parallax of Mars was again measured in an effort to determine the Sun-Earth distance. This was first performed by Giovanni Domenico Cassini in 1672. The early parallax measurements were hampered by the quality of the instruments. The only occultation of Mars by Venus observed was that of 13 October 1590, seen by Michael Maestlin at Heidelberg. In 1610, Mars was viewed by Italian astronomer Galileo Galilei, who was first to see it via telescope. The first person to draw a map of Mars that displayed any terrain features was the Dutch astronomer Christiaan Huygens.

Martian "canals" 

By the 19th century, the resolution of telescopes reached a level sufficient for surface features to be identified. On 5 September 1877, a perihelic opposition of Mars occurred. The Italian astronomer Giovanni Schiaparelli used a  telescope in Milan to help produce the first detailed map of Mars. These maps notably contained features he called canali, which were later shown to be an optical illusion. These canali were supposedly long, straight lines on the surface of Mars, to which he gave names of famous rivers on Earth. His term, which means "channels" or "grooves", was popularly mistranslated in English as "canals".

Influenced by the observations, the orientalist Percival Lowell founded an observatory which had 30- and 45-centimetre (12- and 18-in) telescopes. The observatory was used for the exploration of Mars during the last good opportunity in 1894 and the following less favorable oppositions. He published several books on Mars and life on the planet, which had a great influence on the public. The canali were independently observed by other astronomers, like Henri Joseph Perrotin and Louis Thollon in Nice, using one of the largest telescopes of that time.

The seasonal changes (consisting of the diminishing of the polar caps and the dark areas formed during Martian summer) in combination with the canals led to speculation about life on Mars, and it was a long-held belief that Mars contained vast seas and vegetation. As bigger telescopes were used, fewer long, straight canali were observed. During observations in 1909 by Antoniadi with an  telescope, irregular patterns were observed, but no canali were seen.

Physical characteristics 

Mars is approximately half the diameter of Earth, with a surface area only slightly less than the total area of Earth's dry land. Mars is less dense than Earth, having about 15% of Earth's volume and 11% of Earth's mass, resulting in about 38% of Earth's surface gravity. The red-orange appearance of the Martian surface is caused by ferric oxide, or rust. It can look like butterscotch; other common surface colors include golden, brown, tan, and greenish, depending on the minerals present.

Internal structure 

Like Earth, Mars has differentiated into a dense metallic core overlaid by less dense materials. Current models of its interior imply a core consisting primarily of iron and nickel with about 16–17% sulfur. This iron(II) sulfide core is thought to be twice as rich in lighter elements as Earth's. The core is surrounded by a silicate mantle that formed many of the tectonic and volcanic features on the planet, but it appears to be dormant. Besides silicon and oxygen, the most abundant elements in the Martian crust are iron, magnesium, aluminium, calcium, and potassium. By comparison, Earth's crust averages  in thickness.

Mars is seismically active. In 2019, it was reported that InSight (now offline) had detected and recorded over 450 marsquakes and related events. To this, it has been suggested that the core contains some amount of lighter elements like oxygen and hydrogen in addition to the iron–nickel alloy and about 15% of sulfur.

The core of Mars is overlaid by the rocky mantle, which does not seem to have a thermally insulating layer analogous to the Earth's lower mantle. The Martian mantle appears to be solid down to the depth of about 500 km, where the low-velocity zone (partially melted asthenosphere) begins. Below the asthenosphere the velocity of seismic waves starts to grow again; and at the depth of about 1050 km lies the boundary of the transition zone extending down to the core.

Surface geology 

Mars is a terrestrial planet with a surface that consists of minerals containing silicon and oxygen, metals, and other elements that typically make up rock. The Martian surface is primarily composed of tholeiitic basalt, although parts are more silica-rich than typical basalt and may be similar to andesitic rocks on Earth, or silica glass. Regions of low albedo suggest concentrations of plagioclase feldspar, with northern low albedo regions displaying higher than normal concentrations of sheet silicates and high-silicon glass. Parts of the southern highlands include detectable amounts of high-calcium pyroxenes. Localized concentrations of hematite and olivine have been found. Much of the surface is deeply covered by finely grained iron(III) oxide dust.

Although Mars has no evidence of a structured global magnetic field, observations show that parts of the planet's crust have been magnetized, suggesting that alternating polarity reversals of its dipole field have occurred in the past. This paleomagnetism of magnetically susceptible minerals is similar to the alternating bands found on Earth's ocean floors. One theory, published in 1999 and re-examined in October 2005 (with the help of the Mars Global Surveyor), is that these bands suggest plate tectonic activity on Mars four billion years ago, before the planetary dynamo ceased to function and the planet's magnetic field faded.

Scientists have theorized that during the Solar System's formation Mars was created as the result of a random process of run-away accretion of material from the protoplanetary disk that orbited the Sun. Mars has many distinctive chemical features caused by its position in the Solar System. Elements with comparatively low boiling points, such as chlorine, phosphorus, and sulfur, are much more common on Mars than Earth; these elements were probably pushed outward by the young Sun's energetic solar wind.

After the formation of the planets, all were subjected to the so-called "Late Heavy Bombardment". About 60% of the surface of Mars shows a record of impacts from that era, whereas much of the remaining surface is probably underlain by immense impact basins caused by those events. There is evidence of an enormous impact basin in the Northern Hemisphere of Mars, spanning , or roughly four times the size of the Moon's South Pole – Aitken basin, the largest impact basin yet discovered. This theory suggests that Mars was struck by a Pluto-sized body about four billion years ago. The event, thought to be the cause of the Martian hemispheric dichotomy, created the smooth Borealis basin that covers 40% of the planet.

The geological history of Mars can be split into many periods, but the following are the three primary periods:
 Noachian period: Formation of the oldest extant surfaces of Mars, 4.5 to 3.5 billion years ago. Noachian age surfaces are scarred by many large impact craters. The Tharsis bulge, a volcanic upland, is thought to have formed during this period, with extensive flooding by liquid water late in the period. Named after Noachis Terra.
 Hesperian period: 3.5 to between 3.3 and 2.9 billion years ago. The Hesperian period is marked by the formation of extensive lava plains. Named after Hesperia Planum.
 Amazonian period: between 3.3 and 2.9 billion years ago to the present. Amazonian regions have few meteorite impact craters but are otherwise quite varied. Olympus Mons formed during this period, with lava flows elsewhere on Mars. Named after Amazonis Planitia.

Geological activity is still taking place on Mars. The Athabasca Valles is home to sheet-like lava flows created about 200 mya. Water flows in the grabens called the Cerberus Fossae occurred less than 20 Mya, indicating equally recent volcanic intrusions. The Mars Reconnaissance Orbiter has captured images of avalanches.

Soil 

The Phoenix lander returned data showing Martian soil to be slightly alkaline and containing elements such as magnesium, sodium, potassium and chlorine. These nutrients are found in soils on Earth. They are necessary for growth of plants. Experiments performed by the lander showed that the Martian soil has a basic pH of 7.7, and contains 0.6% of the salt perchlorate, concentrations that are toxic to humans.

Streaks are common across Mars and new ones appear frequently on steep slopes of craters, troughs, and valleys. The streaks are dark at first and get lighter with age. The streaks can start in a tiny area, then spread out for hundreds of metres. They have been seen to follow the edges of boulders and other obstacles in their path. The commonly accepted theories include that they are dark underlying layers of soil revealed after avalanches of bright dust or dust devils. Several other explanations have been put forward, including those that involve water or even the growth of organisms.

Hydrology 

Water in its liquid form cannot exist on the surface of Mars due to low atmospheric pressure, which is less than 1% that of Earth's, except at the lowest of elevations for short periods. The two polar ice caps appear to be made largely of water. Large quantities of ice are thought to be trapped within the thick cryosphere of Mars. Radar data from Mars Express and the Mars Reconnaissance Orbiter (MRO) show large quantities of ice at both poles, and at middle latitudes. The Phoenix lander directly sampled water ice in shallow Martian soil on 31 July 2008.

Landforms visible on Mars strongly suggest that liquid water has existed on the planet's surface. Huge linear swathes of scoured ground, known as outflow channels, cut across the surface in about 25 places. These are thought to be a record of erosion caused by the catastrophic release of water from subsurface aquifers, though some of these structures have been hypothesized to result from the action of glaciers or lava. It is thought to have been carved by flowing water early in Mars's history. The youngest of these channels are thought to have formed only a few million years ago. Elsewhere, particularly on the oldest areas of the Martian surface, finer-scale, dendritic networks of valleys are spread across significant proportions of the landscape. Features of these valleys and their distribution strongly imply that they were carved by runoff resulting from precipitation in early Mars history. Subsurface water flow and groundwater sapping may play important subsidiary roles in some networks, but precipitation was probably the root cause of the incision in almost all cases.

Along crater and canyon walls, there are thousands of features that appear similar to terrestrial gullies. The gullies tend to be in the highlands of the Southern Hemisphere and to face the Equator; all are poleward of 30° latitude. A number of authors have suggested that their formation process involves liquid water, probably from melting ice, although others have argued for formation mechanisms involving carbon dioxide frost or the movement of dry dust. No partially degraded gullies have formed by weathering and no superimposed impact craters have been observed, indicating that these are young features, possibly still active. Other geological features, such as deltas and alluvial fans preserved in craters, are further evidence for warmer, wetter conditions at an interval or intervals in earlier Mars history. Such conditions necessarily require the widespread presence of crater lakes across a large proportion of the surface, for which there is independent mineralogical, sedimentological and geomorphological evidence. Further evidence that liquid water once existed on the surface of Mars comes from the detection of specific minerals such as hematite and goethite, both of which sometimes form in the presence of water.

Polar caps 

Mars has two permanent polar ice caps. During a pole's winter, it lies in continuous darkness, chilling the surface and causing the deposition of 25–30% of the atmosphere into slabs of CO2 ice (dry ice). When the poles are again exposed to sunlight, the frozen CO2 sublimes. These seasonal actions transport large amounts of dust and water vapor, giving rise to Earth-like frost and large cirrus clouds. Clouds of water-ice were photographed by the Opportunity rover in 2004.

The caps at both poles consist primarily (70%) of water ice. Frozen carbon dioxide accumulates as a comparatively thin layer about one metre thick on the north cap in the northern winter only, whereas the south cap has a permanent dry ice cover about eight metres thick. This permanent dry ice cover at the south pole is peppered by flat floored, shallow, roughly circular pits, which repeat imaging shows are expanding in some places and retreating in others. The total volume of ice in the south polar cap plus the adjacent layered deposits has been estimated at 1.6 million cubic km. Both polar caps show spiral troughs, which recent analysis of SHARAD ice penetrating radar has shown are a result of katabatic winds that spiral due to the Coriolis effect.

The seasonal frosting of areas near the southern ice cap results in the formation of transparent 1-metre-thick slabs of dry ice above the ground. With the arrival of spring, sunlight warms the subsurface and pressure from subliming CO2 builds up under a slab, elevating and ultimately rupturing it. This leads to geyser-like eruptions of CO2 gas mixed with dark basaltic sand or dust. This process is rapid, observed happening in the space of a few days, weeks or months, a rate of change rather unusual in geology – especially for Mars. The gas rushing underneath a slab to the site of a geyser carves a spiderweb-like pattern of radial channels under the ice, the process being the inverted equivalent of an erosion network formed by water draining through a single plughole.

Observations and findings of water evidence

In 2004, Opportunity detected the mineral jarosite. This forms only in the presence of acidic water, showing that water once existed on Mars. The Spirit rover found concentrated deposits of silica in 2007 that indicated wet conditions in the past, and in December 2011, the mineral gypsum, which also forms in the presence of water, was found on the surface by NASA's Mars rover Opportunity.

On 18 March 2013, NASA reported evidence from instruments on the Curiosity rover of mineral hydration, likely hydrated calcium sulfate, in several rock samples including the broken fragments of "Tintina" rock and "Sutton Inlier" rock as well as in veins and nodules in other rocks like "Knorr" rock and "Wernicke" rock. In September 2015, NASA announced that they had found strong evidence of hydrated brine flows in recurring slope lineae, based on spectrometer readings of the darkened areas of slopes. These streaks flow downhill in Martian summer, when the temperature is above −23° Celsius, and freeze at lower temperatures. These observations supported earlier hypotheses, based on timing of formation and their rate of growth, that these dark streaks resulted from water flowing just below the surface. However, later work suggested that the lineae may be dry, granular flows instead, with at most a limited role for water in initiating the process. A definitive conclusion about the presence, extent, and role of liquid water on the Martian surface remains elusive.

Researchers suspect much of the low northern plains of the planet were covered with an ocean hundreds of meters deep, though this theory remains controversial. In March 2015, scientists stated that such an ocean might have been the size of Earth's Arctic Ocean. This finding was derived from the ratio of protium to deuterium in the modern Martian atmosphere compared to that ratio on Earth. The amount of Martian deuterium is eight times the amount that exists on Earth, suggesting that ancient Mars had significantly higher levels of water. Results from the Curiosity rover had previously found a high ratio of deuterium in Gale Crater, though not significantly high enough to suggest the former presence of an ocean. Other scientists caution that these results have not been confirmed, and point out that Martian climate models have not yet shown that the planet was warm enough in the past to support bodies of liquid water.

In November 2016, NASA reported finding a large amount of underground ice in the Utopia Planitia region. The volume of water detected has been estimated to be equivalent to the volume of water in Lake Superior (which is 12,100 cubic kilometres). During observations from 2018 through 2021, the ExoMars Trace Gas Orbiter spotted indications of water, probably subsurface ice, in the Valles Marineris canyon system.

Geography and names 

Although better remembered for mapping the Moon, Johann Heinrich Mädler and Wilhelm Beer were the first areographers. They began by establishing that most of Mars's surface features were permanent and by more precisely determining the planet's rotation period. In 1840, Mädler combined ten years of observations and drew the first map of Mars.

Features on Mars are named from a variety of sources. Albedo features are named for classical mythology. Craters larger than roughly 50 km are named for deceased scientists and writers and others who have contributed to the study of Mars. Smaller craters are named for towns and villages of the world with populations of less than 100,000. Large valleys are named for the word "Mars" or "star" in various languages; smaller valleys are named for rivers.

Large albedo features retain many of the older names but are often updated to reflect new knowledge of the nature of the features. For example, Nix Olympica (the snows of Olympus) has become Olympus Mons (Mount Olympus). The surface of Mars as seen from Earth is divided into two kinds of areas, with differing albedo. The paler plains covered with dust and sand rich in reddish iron oxides were once thought of as Martian "continents" and given names like Arabia Terra (land of Arabia) or Amazonis Planitia (Amazonian plain). The dark features were thought to be seas, hence their names Mare Erythraeum, Mare Sirenum and Aurorae Sinus. The largest dark feature seen from Earth is Syrtis Major Planum. The permanent northern polar ice cap is named Planum Boreum. The southern cap is called Planum Australe.

Mars's equator is defined by its rotation, but the location of its Prime Meridian was specified, as was Earth's (at Greenwich), by choice of an arbitrary point; Mädler and Beer selected a line for their first maps of Mars in 1830. After the spacecraft Mariner 9 provided extensive imagery of Mars in 1972, a small crater (later called Airy-0), located in the Sinus Meridiani ("Middle Bay" or "Meridian Bay"), was chosen by Merton Davies, Harold Masursky, and Gérard de Vaucouleurs for the definition of 0.0° longitude to coincide with the original selection.

Because Mars has no oceans and hence no "sea level", a zero-elevation surface had to be selected as a reference level; this is called the areoid of Mars, analogous to the terrestrial geoid. This pressure corresponds to the triple point of water, and it is about 0.6% of the sea level surface pressure on Earth (0.006 atm).

For mapping purposes, the United States Geological Survey divides the surface of Mars into thirty cartographic quadrangles, each named for a classical albedo feature it contains.

Volcanoes 

The shield volcano Olympus Mons (Mount Olympus) is an extinct volcano in the vast upland region Tharsis, which contains several other large volcanoes. Because the mountain is so large, with complex structure at its edges, allocating a height to it is difficult.

Impact topography 
The dichotomy of Martian topography is striking: northern plains flattened by lava flows contrast with the southern highlands, pitted and cratered by ancient impacts. It is possible that, four billion years ago, the Northern Hemisphere of Mars was struck by an object one-tenth to two-thirds the size of Earth's Moon. If this is the case, the Northern Hemisphere of Mars would be the site of an impact crater  in size, or roughly the area of Europe, Asia, and Australia combined, surpassing Utopia Planitia and the Moon's South Pole–Aitken basin as the largest impact crater in the Solar System.

Due to the smaller mass and size of Mars, the probability of an object colliding with the planet is about half that of Earth. Mars is located closer to the asteroid belt, so it has an increased chance of being struck by materials from that source. Mars is more likely to be struck by short-period comets, i.e., those that lie within the orbit of Jupiter.

Martian craters can have a morphology that suggests the ground became wet after the meteor impacted.

Tectonic sites 

The length of Valles Marineris is equivalent to the length of Europe and extends across one-fifth the circumference of Mars. Valles Marineris was formed due to the swelling of the Tharsis area, which caused the crust in the area of Valles Marineris to collapse. In 2012, it was proposed that Valles Marineris is not just a graben, but a plate boundary where  of transverse motion has occurred, making Mars a planet with possibly a two-tectonic plate arrangement.

Holes and caves 
Images from the Thermal Emission Imaging System (THEMIS) aboard NASA's Mars Odyssey orbiter have revealed seven possible cave entrances on the flanks of the volcano Arsia Mons. The caves, named after loved ones of their discoverers, are collectively known as the "seven sisters". Because light does not reach the floor of most of the caves, they may extend much deeper than these lower estimates and widen below the surface. The interiors of these caverns may be protected from micrometeoroids, UV radiation, solar flares and high energy particles that bombard the planet's surface.

Atmosphere 

Mars lost its magnetosphere 4 billion years ago, possibly because of numerous asteroid strikes, so the solar wind interacts directly with the Martian ionosphere, lowering the atmospheric density by stripping away atoms from the outer layer. Both Mars Global Surveyor and Mars Express have detected ionised atmospheric particles trailing off into space behind Mars, and this atmospheric loss is being studied by the MAVEN orbiter. Compared to Earth, the atmosphere of Mars is quite rarefied. The resulting mean surface pressure is only 0.6% of that of Earth  .

The atmosphere of Mars consists of about 96% carbon dioxide, 1.93% argon and 1.89% nitrogen along with traces of oxygen and water. The atmosphere is quite dusty, containing particulates about 1.5 µm in diameter which give the Martian sky a tawny color when seen from the surface. It may take on a pink hue due to iron oxide particles suspended in it. The concentration of methane in the Martian atmosphere fluctuates from about 0.24 ppb during the northern winter to about 0.65 ppb during the summer. Estimates of its lifetime range from 0.6 to 4 years, so its presence indicates that an active source of the gas must be present. Methane could be produced by non-biological process such as serpentinization involving water, carbon dioxide, and the mineral olivine, which is known to be common on Mars, or by Martian life.

Compared to Earth, its higher concentration of atmospheric CO2 and lower surface pressure may be why sound is attenuated more on Mars, where natural sources are rare apart from the wind. Using acoustic recordings collected by the Perseverance rover, researchers concluded that the speed of sound there is approximately 240 m/s for frequencies below 240 Hz, and 250 m/s for those above.

Auroras have been detected on Mars. Because Mars lacks a global magnetic field, the types and distribution of auroras there differ from those on Earth; rather than being mostly restricted to polar regions as is the case on Earth, a Martian aurora can encompass the planet. In September 2017, NASA reported radiation levels on the surface of the planet Mars were temporarily doubled, and were associated with an aurora 25 times brighter than any observed earlier, due to a massive, and unexpected, solar storm in the middle of the month.

Climate 

Of all the planets in the Solar System, the seasons of Mars are the most Earth-like, due to the similar tilts of the two planets' rotational axes. The lengths of the Martian seasons are about twice those of Earth's because Mars's greater distance from the Sun leads to the Martian year being about two Earth years long. The wide range in temperatures is due to the thin atmosphere which cannot store much solar heat, the low atmospheric pressure, and the low thermal inertia of Martian soil. The planet is 1.52 times as far from the Sun as Earth, resulting in just 43% of the amount of sunlight.

If Mars had an Earth-like orbit, its seasons would be similar to Earth's because its axial tilt is similar to Earth's. The comparatively large eccentricity of the Martian orbit has a significant effect. Mars is near perihelion when it is summer in the Southern Hemisphere and winter in the north, and near aphelion when it is winter in the Southern Hemisphere and summer in the north. As a result, the seasons in the Southern Hemisphere are more extreme and the seasons in the northern are milder than would otherwise be the case.

These can vary from a storm over a small area, to gigantic storms that cover the entire planet. They tend to occur when Mars is closest to the Sun, and have been shown to increase the global temperature.

Orbit and rotation 

The solar day (or sol) on Mars is only slightly longer than an Earth day: 24 hours, 39 minutes, and 35.244 seconds. A Martian year is equal to 1.8809 Earth years, or 1 year, 320 days, and 18.2 hours.

The axial tilt of Mars is 25.19° relative to its orbital plane, which is similar to the axial tilt of Earth. As a result, Mars has seasons like Earth, though on Mars they are nearly twice as long because its orbital period is that much longer. In the present day epoch, the orientation of the north pole of Mars is close to the star Deneb.

Mars has a relatively pronounced orbital eccentricity of about 0.09; of the seven other planets in the Solar System, only Mercury has a larger orbital eccentricity. It is known that in the past, Mars has had a much more circular orbit. At one point, 1.35 million Earth years ago, Mars had an eccentricity of roughly 0.002, much less than that of Earth today. Mars's cycle of eccentricity is 96,000 Earth years compared to Earth's cycle of 100,000 years.

Mars approaches Earth in a synodic period of 779.94 days. Earth orbits the Sun the closest to Mars's orbit around the Sun, and Mars orbit is the second closest to Earth after the orbit of Venus. Therefore, their closest approaches, the inferior conjunctions, are the second closest for Earth after those with Venus, and the closest for Mars to any other planet. The gravitational potential difference, and thus the delta-v needed to transfer between Mars and Earth is the second lowest for Earth and the lowest for Mars to any other planet, while transfers can possibly be optimized with Venus flybys.

Habitability and search for life 

During the late nineteenth century, it was widely accepted in the astronomical community that Mars had life-supporting qualities, including the presence of oxygen and water. However, in 1894 W. W. Campbell at Lick Observatory observed the planet and found that "if water vapor or oxygen occur in the atmosphere of Mars it is in quantities too small to be detected by spectroscopes then available". That observation contradicted many of the measurements of the time and was not widely accepted. Campbell and V. M. Slipher repeated the study in 1909 using better instruments, but with the same results. It wasn't until the findings were confirmed by W. S. Adams in 1925 that the myth of the Earth-like habitability of Mars was finally broken. However, even in the 1960s, articles were published on Martian biology, putting aside explanations other than life for the seasonal changes on Mars. Detailed scenarios for the metabolism and chemical cycles for a functional ecosystem were being published as late as 1962.

The current understanding of planetary habitabilitythe ability of a world to develop environmental conditions favorable to the emergence of lifefavors planets that have liquid water on their surface. Most often this requires the orbit of a planet to lie within the habitable zone, which for the Sun is estimated to extend from within the orbit of Earth to about that of Mars. During perihelion, Mars dips inside this region, but Mars's thin (low-pressure) atmosphere prevents liquid water from existing over large regions for extended periods. The past flow of liquid water demonstrates the planet's potential for habitability. Recent evidence has suggested that any water on the Martian surface may have been too salty and acidic to support regular terrestrial life.

The environmental conditions on Mars are a challenge to sustaining organic life: the planet has little heat transfer across its surface, it has poor insulation against bombardment by the solar wind due to the absence of a magnetosphere and has insufficient atmospheric pressure to retain water in a liquid form (water instead sublimes to a gaseous state). Mars is nearly, or perhaps totally, geologically dead; the end of volcanic activity has apparently stopped the recycling of chemicals and minerals between the surface and interior of the planet.

In situ investigations have been performed on Mars by the Viking landers, Spirit and Opportunity rovers, Phoenix lander, and Curiosity rover. Evidence suggests that the planet was once significantly more habitable than it is today, but whether living organisms ever existed there remains unknown. The Viking probes of the mid-1970s carried experiments designed to detect microorganisms in Martian soil at their respective landing sites and had positive results, including a temporary increase of  production on exposure to water and nutrients. This sign of life was later disputed by scientists, resulting in a continuing debate, with NASA scientist Gilbert Levin asserting that Viking may have found life. Tests conducted by the Phoenix Mars lander have shown that the soil has an alkaline pH and it contains magnesium, sodium, potassium and chloride. The soil nutrients may be able to support life, but life would still have to be shielded from the intense ultraviolet light. A 2014 analysis of Martian meteorite EETA79001 found chlorate, perchlorate, and nitrate ions in sufficiently high concentration to suggest that they are widespread on Mars. UV and X-ray radiation would turn chlorate and perchlorate ions into other, highly reactive oxychlorines, indicating that any organic molecules would have to be buried under the surface to survive.

Scientists have proposed that carbonate globules found in meteorite ALH84001, which is thought to have originated from Mars, could be fossilized microbes extant on Mars when the meteorite was blasted from the Martian surface by a meteor strike some 15 million years ago. This proposal has been met with skepticism, and an exclusively inorganic origin for the shapes has been proposed. Small quantities of methane and formaldehyde detected by Mars orbiters are both claimed to be possible evidence for life, as these chemical compounds would quickly break down in the Martian atmosphere. Alternatively, these compounds may instead be replenished by volcanic or other geological means, such as serpentinite. Impact glass, formed by the impact of meteors, which on Earth can preserve signs of life, has also been found on the surface of the impact craters on Mars. Likewise, the glass in impact craters on Mars could have preserved signs of life, if life existed at the site.

Moons 

The origin of both moons is unclear, although a popular theory states that they were asteroids captured into Martian orbit.

Both satellites were discovered in 1877 by Asaph Hall and were named after the characters Phobos (the deity of panic and fear) and Deimos (the deity of terror and dread), twins from Greek mythology who accompanied their father Ares, god of war, into battle. Mars was the Roman equivalent to Ares. In modern Greek, the planet retains its ancient name Ares (Aris: Άρης).

From the surface of Mars, the motions of Phobos and Deimos appear different from that of the Earth's satellite, the Moon. Phobos rises in the west, sets in the east, and rises again in just 11 hours. Deimos, being only just outside synchronous orbitwhere the orbital period would match the planet's period of rotationrises as expected in the east, but slowly. Because the orbit of Phobos is below synchronous altitude, tidal forces from Mars are gradually lowering its orbit. In about 50 million years, it could either crash into Mars's surface or break up into a ring structure around the planet.

The origin of the two satellites is not well understood. Their low albedo and carbonaceous chondrite composition have been regarded as similar to asteroids, supporting a capture theory. The unstable orbit of Phobos would seem to point toward a relatively recent capture. But both have circular orbits, near the equator that is unusual for captured objects and the required capture dynamics are complex. Accretion early in the history of Mars is plausible, but would not account for a composition resembling asteroids rather than Mars itself, if that is confirmed.

A third possibility for their origin as satellites of Mars is the involvement of a third body or a type of impact disruption. More-recent lines of evidence for Phobos having a highly porous interior, and suggesting a composition containing mainly phyllosilicates and other minerals known from Mars, point toward an origin of Phobos from material ejected by an impact on Mars that reaccreted in Martian orbit, similar to the prevailing theory for the origin of Earth's satellite. Although the visible and near-infrared (VNIR) spectra of the moons of Mars resemble those of outer-belt asteroids, the thermal infrared spectra of Phobos are reported to be inconsistent with chondrites of any class. It is also possible that Phobos and Deimos are fragments of an older moon, formed by debris from a large impact on Mars, and then destroyed by a more recent impact upon the satellite.

Exploration 

Dozens of crewless spacecraft, including orbiters, landers, and rovers, have been sent to Mars by the Soviet Union, the United States, Europe, India, the United Arab Emirates, and China to study the planet's surface, climate, and geology. NASA's Mariner 4 was the first spacecraft to visit Mars; launched on 28 November 1964, it made its closest approach to the planet on 15 July 1965. Mariner 4 detected the weak Martian radiation belt, measured at about 0.1% that of Earth, and captured the first images of another planet from deep space.

Once spacecraft visited the planet during NASA's Mariner missions in the 1960s and 1970s, many previous concepts of Mars were radically broken. After the results of the Viking life-detection experiments, the hypothesis of a dead planet was generally accepted. The data from Mariner 9 and Viking allowed better maps of Mars to be made, and the Mars Global Surveyor mission, which launched in 1996 and operated until late 2006, produced complete, extremely detailed maps of the Martian topography, magnetic field and surface minerals. These maps are available online at websites including Google Mars. Both the Mars Reconnaissance Orbiter and Mars Express continued exploring with new instruments and supporting lander missions. NASA provides two online tools: Mars Trek, which provides visualizations of the planet using data from 50 years of exploration, and Experience Curiosity, which simulates traveling on Mars in 3-D with Curiosity.

, Mars is host to thirteen functioning spacecraft. Eight are in orbit: 2001 Mars Odyssey, Mars Express, Mars Reconnaissance Orbiter, MAVEN, ExoMars Trace Gas Orbiter, the Hope orbiter, and the Tianwen-1 orbiter. Another five are on the surface: the Mars Science Laboratory Curiosity rover, the Perseverance rover, the Ingenuity helicopter, the Tianwen-1 lander, and the Zhurong rover.

Planned missions to Mars include the Rosalind Franklin rover mission, designed to search for evidence of past life, which was intended to be launched in 2018 but has been repeatedly delayed, with a launch date pushed to 2024 at the earliest, with a more likely one sometime in 2028. A current concept for a joint NASA-ESA mission to return samples from Mars would launch in 2026.

Several plans for a human mission to Mars have been proposed throughout the 20th and 21st centuries, but none have come to fruition. The NASA Authorization Act of 2017 directed NASA to study the feasibility of a crewed Mars mission in the early 2030s; the resulting report eventually concluded that this would be unfeasible. In addition, in 2021, China was planning to send a crewed Mars mission in 2033. Privately held companies such as SpaceX have also proposed plans to send humans to Mars, with the eventual goal to settle on the planet. The moon Phobos has been proposed as an anchor point for a space elevator.

Astronomy on Mars 

With the presence of various orbiters, landers, and rovers, it is possible to practice astronomy from Mars. Although Mars's moon Phobos appears about one-third the angular diameter of the full moon on Earth, Deimos appears more or less star-like, looking only slightly brighter than Venus does from Earth.

Various phenomena seen from Earth have also been observed from Mars, such as meteors and auroras. The apparent sizes of the moons Phobos and Deimos are sufficiently smaller than that of the Sun; thus, their partial "eclipses" of the Sun are best considered transits (see transit of Deimos and Phobos from Mars). Transits of Mercury and Venus have been observed from Mars. A transit of Earth will be seen from Mars on 10 November 2084.

Viewing 

The mean apparent magnitude of Mars is +0.71 with a standard deviation of 1.05. Because the orbit of Mars is eccentric, the magnitude at opposition from the Sun can range from about −3.0 to −1.4. The minimum brightness is magnitude +1.86 when the planet is near aphelion and in conjunction with the Sun. At its brightest, Mars (along with Jupiter) is second only to Venus in luminosity. Mars usually appears distinctly yellow, orange, or red. When farthest away from Earth, it is more than seven times farther away than when it is closest. Mars is usually close enough for particularly good viewing once or twice at 15-year or 17-year intervals. As Mars approaches opposition, it begins a period of retrograde motion, which means it will appear to move backwards in a looping curve with respect to the background stars. This retrograde motion lasts for about 72 days, and Mars reaches its peak luminosity in the middle of this interval.

The point at which Mars's geocentric longitude is 180° different from the Sun's is known as opposition, which is near the time of closest approach to Earth. The time of opposition can occur as much as 8.5 days away from the closest approach. The distance at close approach varies between about  due to the planets' elliptical orbits, which causes comparable variation in angular size. The average time between the successive oppositions of Mars, its synodic period, is 780 days; but the number of days between the dates of successive oppositions can range from 764 to 812.

Mars comes into opposition from Earth every 2.1 years. The planets come into opposition near Mars's perihelion in 2003, 2018 and 2035, with the 2020 and 2033 events being particularly close to perihelic opposition. Mars made its closest approach to Earth and maximum apparent brightness in nearly 60,000 years, magnitude −2.88, on 27 August 2003, at 09:51:13 UTC. This occurred when Mars was one day from opposition and about three days from its perihelion, making it particularly easy to see from Earth. The last time it came so close is estimated to have been on 12 September 57,617 BC, the next time being in 2287. This record approach was only slightly closer than other recent close approaches.

In culture 

Mars is named after the Roman god of war. This association between Mars and war dates back at least to Babylonian astronomy, in which the planet was named for the god Nergal, deity of war and destruction. It persisted into modern times, as exemplified by Gustav Holst's orchestral suite The Planets, whose famous first movement labels Mars "the bringer of war". The planet's symbol, a circle with a spear pointing out to the upper right, is also used as a symbol for the male gender. The symbol dates from at latest the 11th century, though a possible predecessor has been found in the Greek Oxyrhynchus Papyri.

The idea that Mars was populated by intelligent Martians became widespread in the late 19th century. Schiaparelli's "canali" observations combined with Percival Lowell's books on the subject put forward the standard notion of a planet that was a drying, cooling, dying world with ancient civilizations constructing irrigation works. Many other observations and proclamations by notable personalities added to what has been termed "Mars Fever". High-resolution mapping of the surface of Mars revealed no artifacts of habitation, but pseudoscientific speculation about intelligent life on Mars still continues. Reminiscent of the canali observations, these speculations are based on small scale features perceived in the spacecraft images, such as "pyramids" and the "Face on Mars". In his book Cosmos, planetary astronomer Carl Sagan wrote: "Mars has become a kind of mythic arena onto which we have projected our Earthly hopes and fears."

The depiction of Mars in fiction has been stimulated by its dramatic red color and by nineteenth-century scientific speculations that its surface conditions might support not just life but intelligent life. This gave way to many science fiction stories involving these concepts, such as H. G. Wells' The War of the Worlds, in which Martians seek to escape their dying planet by invading Earth, Ray Bradbury's The Martian Chronicles, in which human explorers accidentally destroy a Martian civilization, as well as Edgar Rice Burroughs' Barsoom series, C. S. Lewis' novel Out of the Silent Planet (1938), and a number of Robert A. Heinlein stories before the mid-sixties. Since then, depictions of Martians have also extended to animation. A comic figure of an intelligent Martian, Marvin the Martian, appeared in Haredevil Hare (1948) as a character in the Looney Tunes animated cartoons of Warner Brothers, and has continued as part of popular culture to the present. After the Mariner and Viking spacecraft had returned pictures of Mars as it really is, a lifeless and canal-less world, these ideas about Mars were abandoned; for many science-fiction authors, the new discoveries initially seemed like a constraint, but eventually the post-Viking knowledge of Mars became itself a source of inspiration for works like Kim Stanley Robinson's Mars trilogy.

See also 

 Flag of Mars
 List of missions to Mars
 Magnetic field of Mars
 Mars monolith
 Mineralogy of Mars
 Outline of Mars
 List of gravitationally rounded objects of the Solar System

Notes

References

External links 
 Mars Trek – An integrated map browser of maps and datasets for Mars
 Google Mars and Google Mars 3D, interactive maps of the planet

 
Articles containing video clips
Astronomical objects known since antiquity
Planets of the Solar System
Terrestrial planets